The Rolling Stones (also published under the name Space Family Stone in the United Kingdom) is a 1952 science fiction novel by American writer Robert A. Heinlein.

A condensed version of the novel had been published earlier in Boys' Life (September, October, November, December 1952) under the title "Tramp Space Ship".  It was published in hardcover that year by Scribner's as part of the Heinlein juveniles.

Plot summary

The Stones, a family of "Loonies" (residents of the Moon, also known as Luna), purchase and rebuild a used spaceship and go sightseeing around the Solar System.

The twin teenage boys, named Castor and Pollux after the half-brothers of classical legend, buy used bicycles to sell on Mars, their first stop, where they run afoul of local regulations, but their grandmother Hazel Stone saves them from jail. While on Mars, the twins buy their brother Buster a native Martian creature called a flat cat, which produces a soothing vibration, as a pet.

In preparation for the asteroid belt, where the equivalent of a gold rush is in progress prospecting for "core material" and radioactive ores, the twins obtain supplies and luxury goods on Mars to sell at their destination, on the principle that it is shopkeepers, not miners, who get rich during gold rushes. En route, the flat cat and its offspring overpopulate the ship so the family places them in hibernation and later sells them to the miners.

The novel ends with the family setting out to see the rings of Saturn.

Research
As with his other novels, Heinlein and his wife Virginia "spent countless hours in research, fiercely dedicated to getting it right for their readers."

Influences
Heinlein later credited the 1905 Ellis Parker Butler short story "Pigs Is Pigs" with inspiring the flat cat incident.  A similar concept and plotline appeared later in the Star Trek episode "The Trouble with Tribbles". According to screenwriter David Gerrold, the show's producers noticed similarities in the two stories and asked Heinlein for permission to use the idea.  Heinlein asked for an autographed copy of the script, but otherwise did not object, noting that both stories owed something to the Butler story "and possibly to Noah".

Connections to other Heinlein works

In Chapter XIII ("Caveat Vendor"), Hazel Stone tells the judge, "I am a stranger here in a strange land" (paraphrasing ). Heinlein later used the same Biblical quote as the title of his Hugo-award winning novel of 1961.

The book makes several references to Hazel as an influential figure in founding the Lunar colony. Fourteen years later, Heinlein published The Moon Is a Harsh Mistress, which tells the story of the Lunar revolution, including a small but vital role that Hazel Stone played as a child (no specifics of this role are mentioned in The Rolling Stones; she is portrayed here simply as a "founding Father"). Hazel, Castor, and Pollux reappear in Number of the Beast and The Cat Who Walks Through Walls. Hazel, alone, appears in To Sail Beyond the Sunset.

Dr. Lowell Stone ("Buster") is quoted in a chapter heading in The Cat Who Walks Through Walls and referenced as Chief Surgeon at Ceres General. In that same book, Hazel states that Roger and Edith are now living in the extrasolar colony known as Fiddler's Green (itself first named in Friday).

The general description of the Martian met by Lowell is similar to the description of the Martians depicted in Red Planet and later in Stranger in a Strange Land.

Reception

Groff Conklin described the novel as "a thoroughly delightful job". Boucher and McComas praised it as "easily the most plausible, carefully detailed picture of an interplanetary future we will encounter in any year". P. Schuyler Miller cited the novel's "freshness and simplicity," characterizing it as "a life-size portrait-gallery of real people living in a real world of the future, every detail of which fits into place with top-tolerance precision".

Surveying Heinlein's juvenile novels, Jack Williamson characterized Heinlein's story as "a dream of personal freedom" written with "an enviable craftsmanship", noted that the novel "carries its thematic burden tightly", unlike Heinlein's later adult novels, and praised The Rolling Stones for its "sense of an accurately extrapolated future background, with all of the new technologies given an air of commonplace reality".

References

External links

1952 American novels
1952 science fiction novels
Novels by Robert A. Heinlein
American science fiction novels
American young adult novels
Fiction about asteroid mining
Children's science fiction novels
Fiction about main-belt asteroids
Space exploration novels